Adrian Strzałkowski (born 20 March 1990) is a Polish track and field athlete who competes in the long jump.

He represented Poland at the 2013 European Athletics Indoor Championships and the 2014 IAAF World Indoor Championships. He was the gold medallist at the 2013 Jeux de la Francophonie.

Career
Born in Szczecin, he was raised in Stalowa Wola, joined up with a local athletics club there and began working with coach Kazimierz Luchowski. Initially he competed in the triple jump but soon focused on the long jump instead. He returned to his native Szczecin in 2009 and turned to Mieczyslaw Komorowski as a coach. It was during this period that he competed internationally for the first time. His debut for Poland came at the 2011 European Athletics U23 Championships, though he did not get past the qualifying round.

Strzałkowski began to study computer science in Łódź and struggled to find a new jumping coach. He eventually found one in Leszek Lipiński at nearby Aleksandrów Łódzki. He regarded this new arrangement as a breakthrough for his career as his performances began to improve. In 2012 he was runner-up at the Polish Indoor Championships and won the under-23 national title. At the start of 2013 he matched his personal best to win his first national title indoors and made his senior international debut at the 2013 European Athletics Indoor Championships, where he came tenth overall. This earned him a place on the team for the 2014 IAAF World Indoor Championships held in Sopot, Poland. He produced the joint second-best mark of his career in the final round and this placed him sixth.

Personal bests
Long jump outdoor –  (2013)
Long jump indoor –  (2014) 
Triple jump outdoor –  (2008)

Competition record

References

External links

Living people
1990 births
Polish male long jumpers
Sportspeople from Szczecin